The  took place at the New National Theater in Tokyo on December 30, 2010. The ceremony was televised in Japan on TBS.

Presenters 
 Masaaki Sakai
 Norika Fujiwara
 TBS commentators
 Shinichirō Azumi
 Sylwia Kato
 Erina Masuda

 Radio
 Masao Mukai (TBS commentator)

Winners and winning works

Grand Prix 
 Exile — "I Wish For You"

Best Singer Award 
 Masahiko Kondō

Best New Artist Award 
 S/mileage "Yume Miru 15"

Best Album Award 
 Ikimonogakari — Hajimari no Uta

New Artist Award 
The artists who are awarded the New Artist Award are nominated for the Best New Artist Award.
 S/mileage "Yume Miru 15"
 Iconiq "Change Myself"
 Madoka Kikuchi 
 Girls' Generation "Gee"
 S/mileage "Yume Miru 15"

Excellence Album Award 
 Kazuyoshi Saito "ARE YOU READY?"
 Nakamuranaka "Shounen Shoujo"
 Ikimonogakari "Hajimarinouta"
 Nishino Kana "to LOVE"
 JUJU "JUJU"

Best Composer Award 
FUNKY MONKEY BABYS/Yuka Kawamura "Atohitotsu"

Best Arranger Award
Jin Namamura "Futatsu no Kuchibiru"

Best Songwriter Award
Uemura Kana "Toile no Kamisama"

Encouragement  Award by Japan Composer's Association
Sakura Maya

Special Award
Sakamoto Fuyumi "Mata Kimi Ni Koi Shiteru"

Music Culture Award
Kayama Yuzo

Special Achievement Award
Ishii Yoshiko
Eguchi Hiroshi
Tani Kei
Hoshino Tetsuro
Yoshioka Osamu

Excellent Work Award
EXILE "I Wish For You" 
AAA "Aitai Riyuu"
Ikimonogakari "Arigatou"
BIG BANG "Tell Me Goodbye"
Uemura Kana "Toile no Kamisama"
Hikawa Kiyoshi "Nijiiro no Bayon"
w-inds "New World"
AKB48 "Beginner"
Mizumori Kaori "Matsushima Kikou"
GIRLS NEXT DOOR "Ready to be a lady"

References

External links
 Official results page

2010
Japan Record Awards
Japan Record Awards
Japan Record Awards
Japan Record Awards